God Bless the Child is the second studio album by West Coast rapper Guerilla Black. It was released on September 18, 2007.

Track listing
"Genesis"
"Thank You (God Bless The Child)" (feat. Janet Vice)
"The Streets" (feat. Chris Jones)
"Whatever" (feat. Hot Dollar) 
"She Wanna Baller"
"Put Yo Hands Up"
"I Know"
"The Life" (feat. Master Poe)
"U Do U"
"Pour Me a Drank"
"Round & Round"
"Revelations"

2007 albums
Guerilla Black albums